Štefan Rusnák (born 7 August 1971) is a former Slovak international football forward who played for clubs in Czechoslovakia and Germany and recently manager of FK Dukla Banská Bystrica.

Career
Rusnák began playing football for FK Dukla Banská Bystrica. After spending most of his career in the former Czechoslovakia, playing for Dukla Banská Bystrica, SK Slavia Prague and ŠK Slovan Bratislava, he moved to Germany to play in the lower leagues for BV Cloppenburg and VfB Oldenburg. He had an unsuccessful trial with FC St. Pauli in 1990.

Rusnák made seven appearances for the Slovakia national football team during 1994 and 1995.

References

External links

1971 births
Living people
Slovak footballers
Slovakia international footballers
FK Dukla Banská Bystrica players
SK Slavia Prague players
ŠK Slovan Bratislava players
Bohemians 1905 players
FC VSS Košice players
VfB Oldenburg players
MŠK Žilina players
FK Železiarne Podbrezová players
Expatriate footballers in Germany
Slovak football managers
FK Dukla Banská Bystrica managers
Association football forwards
Slovak expatriate footballers
Slovak expatriate sportspeople in Germany
BV Cloppenburg players
People from Trstená
Sportspeople from the Žilina Region
Czechoslovak footballers